Cecilia Orozco Tascón is a Colombian journalist. She writes opinion pieces for El Espectador and El País, and is the director of Noticias Uno newscast.

Career 
Ms Orozco majored in social communication at Pontifical Xavierian University, and holds a master's degree in political science. She has been reporter for several written and audiovisual media in Colombia, director of newscasts such as Noticiero de las siete, CM&, and Hora Cero, and readers' ombudswoman at El Tiempo. Besides her column, a weekly interview by Ms Orozco appears every Sunday  at El Espectador.

In 2010, she received the  award to the best opinion column.

Books 
¿Y ahora qué? Futuro de la guerra y la paz en Colombia, El Áncora Editores, 2002.

References

External links 
Cecilia Orozco Tascón  at El Espectador
Cecilia Orozco Tascón at El País
Noticias Uno

Living people
Colombian journalists
Colombian women journalists
Colombian women writers
Year of birth missing (living people)